Tratame bien is an Argentine TV series made by Pol-Ka. It was awarded with seven Martín Fierro Awards in May 2010, including the Golden one.

Plot
The main characters of the series are a married couple, facing a matrimonial crisis. José works at a toyshop near bankruptcy, while Sofía is successful in her work but without being happy from it. They have 2 children that deal with their own maturity crisis as well.

Cast
 Julio Chávez as José
 Cecilia Roth as Sofía
 Cristina Banegas as Clara
 María Onetto as Elsa
 Norman Briski as Arturo

Secondary characters
 Martín Slipak as Damián
 María Alche as Helena
 Guillermo Arengo as Hernán
 Mónica Cabrera as Rosa
 Chunchuna Villafañe as Mecha (Sofía's mother)
 Federico Luppi as Moncho (Sofía's father)
 Alfredo Casero as Nacho
 Mario Moscoso as Laurencio

Guest appearances
 Noemí Frenkel as Nora
 María Carambula as Caro
 Leticia Brédice as Sabrina
 Daniel Fanego as Carlos
 Alejo Ortíz as Nahuel
 Juan Minujín as Mauricio
 Griselda Siciliani as Denise
 Ana Garibaldi as Laura
 Leonor Manso as Mabel
 Paloma Contreras as Gisella
 Fabián Vena as Ezequiel
 Denise Nenezian as Izabella

Awards

Clarín awards 2009
 Best TV series
 Best director
 Best drama actor (Julio Chávez)
 Male revelation (Martín Slipak)

Martín Fierro awards 2009
 Golden Martín Fierro
 Best director
 Best author
 Best script writer
 Best lead actor of TV series (Julio Chávez)
 Best lead actress of TV series (Cecilia Roth)
 Best guest appearance in fiction (Federico Luppi)
 Best secondary actress in drama (Cristina Banegas)

References

External links
 Official site

Argentine drama television series
Golden Martín Fierro Award winners
2009 Argentine television series debuts
2009 Argentine television series endings
2000s Argentine television series
Television shows set in Buenos Aires